Scottish Book of the Year may refer to:

 Scottish Book of the Year, one of the Saltire Society Literary Awards
 Scottish Mortgage Investment Trust Book of the Year, one of the Scottish Mortgage Investment Trust Book Awards